Henry Kaiser may refer to:

People 
Henry Felix Kaiser (1927–1992), American academic known for the varimax rotation
Henry J. Kaiser (1882–1967), American industrialist and shipbuilder who mass produced Liberty Ships for World War II
Henry Kaiser (musician) (born 1952), American jazz guitarist, grandson of Henry J. Kaiser

Ships 
The Henry J. Kaiser class of U.S. Navy fleet replenishment oilers
USNS Henry J. Kaiser (T-AO-187), a United States Navy fleet replenishment oiler in service since 1986

See also
Henry Keizer (1960–2019), Dutch businessman and politician

Kaiser, Henry